Greatest Hits Live is a posthumous compilation album of live recordings made during Roy Orbison's career. It was released in 2006 by Legacy Recordings. It sampled two previous releases; Roy Orbison: Authorized Bootleg Collection and Black & White Night; as well as providing two exclusive tracks.

Track listing
"Only The Lonely"
From "Roy Orbison: Authorized Bootleg Collection"
Recorded 13 July 1980, Birmingham, Alabama
"Ooby Dooby"
From "Roy Orbison: Authorized Bootleg Collection"
 Recorded 18 October 1975, Queen's Theatre, Hornchurch
"Mean Woman Blues"
From "Roy Orbison: Authorized Bootleg Collection"
Recorded 18 October 1975, Queen's Theatre, Hornchurch
"Running Scared"
Previously unreleased
 Recorded early 1980s
"Blue Bayou"
From "Roy Orbison: Authorized Bootleg Collection"
Recorded 9 May 1969, Batley Variety Club
"In Dreams"
From "Roy Orbison: Authorized Bootleg Collection"
Recorded 9 May 1969, Batley Variety Club
"Crying"
From single "Wild Hearts (...time)" - previously unreleased on CD
"Oh, Pretty Woman"
From "Black & White Night"
Recorded 30 September 1987

References

External links 
 Greatest Hits Live, Amazon.com

2006 live albums
2006 compilation albums
Roy Orbison compilation albums
Legacy Recordings compilation albums
Legacy Recordings live albums